Ultravox were a British new wave band.

Ultravox may also refer to:
 Ultravox! (album), the debut album by Ultravox
 Ultravox (software), video streaming software from Nullsoft